The Nobel Prize in Literature is awarded annually by the Swedish Academy to authors for outstanding contributions in the field of literature. It is one of the five Nobel Prizes established by the 1895 will of Alfred Nobel, which are awarded for outstanding contributions in chemistry, physics, literature, peace, and physiology or medicine. As dictated by Nobel's will, the award is administered by the Nobel Foundation and awarded by the Swedish Academy. The first Nobel Prize in Literature was awarded in 1901 to Sully Prudhomme of France. Each recipient receives a medal, a diploma and a monetary award prize that has varied throughout the years. In 1901, Prudhomme received 150,782 SEK, which is equivalent to 8,823,637.78 SEK in January 2018. The award is presented in Stockholm at an annual ceremony on December 10, the anniversary of Nobel's death.

As of 2022, the Nobel Prize in Literature has been awarded to 119 individuals. The youngest laureate was Rudyard Kipling, who was 41 years old when he was awarded in 1907. The oldest laureate to receive the prize was Doris Lessing, who was 88 when she was awarded in 2007. It has been awarded posthumously once, to Erik Axel Karlfeldt in 1931. When he received the award in 1958, Russian-born Boris Pasternak was forced to publicly reject the award under pressure from the government of the Soviet Union. In 1964, Jean-Paul Sartre made known that he did not wish to accept the Nobel Prize in Literature, as he had consistently refused all official honors in the past. However the Nobel committee does not acknowledge refusals, and includes Pasternak and Sartre in its list of Nobel laureates.

Seventeen women have been awarded the Nobel Prize in Literature, the second highest number of any of the Nobel Prizes behind the Nobel Peace Prize. There have been four instances in which the award was given to two people (1904, 1917, 1966, 1974). There have been seven years in which the Nobel Prize in Literature was not awarded (1914, 1918, 1935, 1940–1943). There have been three years for which the Nobel Prize in Literature was delayed one year: the prizes for 1915, 1949 and 2018 were each awarded together with that of the following year in October of the following year. As of 2022, there have been 29 English-speaking laureates of the Nobel Prize in Literature, followed by French with 16 laureates and German with 14 laureates and France has the highest number of Nobel laureates.

Laureates

Nobel laureates by country
The 119 Nobel laureates in literature from 1901 to 2022 have come from the following countries:

Nobel laureates by language

1Rabindranath Tagore (Nobel Prize in Literature 1913) wrote in Bengali and English, Samuel Beckett (Nobel Prize in Literature 1969) wrote in French and English and Joseph Brodsky (Nobel Prize in Literature 1987) wrote poetry in Russian and prose in English. These three Nobel laureates have been sorted under Bengali, French and Russian, respectively.

2Karl Adolph Gjellerup (Nobel Prize in Literature 1917) wrote in Danish and German.

Nobel laureates by sex
The 119 Nobel laureates in literature from 1901 to 2022 were from the following sexes:

References

Notes

A. The information in the country column is according to nobelprize.org, the official website of the Nobel Foundation. This information may not necessarily reflect the recipient's birthplace or citizenship.

Citations

Sources

 

 
Literature